The Asiatic Society of Bangladesh is a non political and non profit research organisation registered under both Society Act of 1864 and NGO Bureau, Government of Bangladesh. The Asiatic Society of Bangladesh was established as the Asiatic Society of East Pakistan in Dhaka in 1952 by a number of Muslim leaders, and renamed in 1972. Ahmed Hasan Dani, a noted Muslim historian and archaeologist of Pakistan played an important role in founding this society. He was assisted by Muhammad Shahidullah, a Bengali linguist. The society is housed in Nimtali, walking distance from the Curzon Hall of Dhaka University, locality of Old Dhaka.

Publications

The society's publications include:
 Banglapedia, the National Encyclopedia of Bangladesh (edition 2, 2012)
 Encyclopedia of Flora and Fauna of Bangladesh (2010, 28 volumes)
 Cultural Survey of Bangladesh, a documentation of the country's cultural history, tradition and heritage (2008, 12 volumes)
 Children’s Banglapedia, a three-volume version of Banglapedia for children
 History of Bangladesh (1704-1971) (3 volumes)
 National Online Biography; Digital publication of the Survey and Settlement Reports (1896-1927)
 Parliamentary Documents and History
 Digest of the reports and surveys on the mineral resources in Bangladesh
 Journal of the Asiatic Society of Bangladesh (Humanities)
 Journal of the Asiatic Society of Bangladesh (Sciences)
 Asiatic Society Patrika

List of presidents

 Abdul Hamid (1952–53)
 Muhammad Shahidullah (1954)
 Abdul Halim (1955)
 Muhammad Ibrahim (1956)
 Khan Bahadur Abdur Rahman Khan (1957–61)
 Abdul Halim (1960–61)
 Muhammad Shahidullah (1962–64)
  Mohammad Enamul Haq (1965–66)
 Muhammad Shahidullah (1967)
 Abdul Maudud (1968)
 Abu B Mohamed Habibullah (1969–73)
 Syed Murtaza Ali (1974)
 Abu B Mohamed Habibullah (1975)
 Kamruddin Ahmed (1976–78)
 Serajul Huq (1979)
 Mohammad Enamul Haq  (1980)
 Khan Bahadur Abdul Hakim (1981)
 Mafizullah Kabir (1982)
 A R Mallick (1983–85)
 AKM Zakaria (1986–87)
 Abdullah al-Muti Sharafuddin (1988–91)
 A. K. M. Nurul Islam (1992–93)
 Sirajul Islam (1994–95)
 Wakil Ahmed (1996–97)
 M Harunur Rashid (1998–99)
 Abdul Momin Chowdhury (2000-2003)
 Emajuddin Ahamed (2004-2007)
 Sirajul Islam (2008-2011)
 Nazrul Islam (2012-2013)
 Amirul Islam Chowdhury (2014–17)
 Mahfuza Khanam (2018–present)

See also 

Banglapedia

References 

Learned societies of Bangladesh
Education in Dhaka
Asian studies
1952 establishments in East Pakistan
Publishing companies of Bangladesh